General Sir Edward Harris Greathed KCB (8 June 1812 – 19 November 1881) was a British Army officer who became General Officer Commanding Eastern District.

Military career
He was born in London, one of the five sons of Edward Harris and Mary Elizabeth Glyn of Uddens, Dorset and baptised in Chalbury, Dorset. One of his brothers became Major-General William Wilberforce Harris Greathed. He was educated at Westminster School before being commissioned as an ensign in the 8th (The King's) Regiment of Foot on 22 June 1832.

He rose through the ranks to become commanding officer of the 8th (The King's) Regiment of Foot and, in that capacity, commanded the a column which defeated and dispersed some 5,000 rebels at the Battle of Agra in August 1857 during the Indian Rebellion.

He then participated in the capture of Ludlow Castle in the vicinity of Kashmiri Gate in the northern walls of Delhi. Grouped into the 2nd Column with the 2nd Bengal Fusiliers and 4th Sikhs, the 8th (The King's) Regiment of Foot attacked Delhi early on 14 September 1857 with the intent of capturing the Water Bastion and Kashmiri Gate. After this attack he led the 3rd Infantry Brigade at the Relief of Lucknow in November 1857 and at the Second Battle of Cawnpore in December 1857 as well as the subsequent capture of Tatya Tope. He was made CB in 1858 and elevated to KCB on 28 March 1865.

After his return to England, he went on to be General Officer Commanding Eastern District in April 1872.
He was given the colonelcy of the 108th Regiment of Foot (Madras Infantry) in 1880 continuing, after its amalgamation later that year into the Inniskilling Fusiliers, as colonel of the 2nd Battalion of the new regiment until his death. He was promoted full general on 1 July 1880 and was placed on the retired list on 1 July 1881.

He died at his home, Uddens House in Chalbury, Dorset on 19 November 1881 and was buried in nearby All Saints churchyard, Hampreston.

Family
He had married three times; firstly in India to Louisa Archer (née Hartwell) on 8 March 1854; secondly Ellen Mary Tuffnell on 18 December 1868 by whom he had a daughter, Helena Mary, born 26 April 1862, who married 1884, Major Keppel Stephenson; and thirdly Charlotte Frederica Caroline Osborn, eldest daughter of Sir George Robert Osborn, 6th Baronet on 4 August 1869. He had at least two sons by his early marriages, and one son and three daughters by his last marriage:
Edward Wilberforce Osborn Greathed, born 7 July 1870; died unmarried 2 December 1893
Charlotte Elizabeth Greathed, born 3 May 1872, married Charles Bayley Oldfield, 6 November 1902
Georgiana Laura Greathed, born 11 July 1874; died unmarried 11 April 1954
Dorothy Louisa Greathed, born 16 February 1876; married 6 November 1902 Eric Hanbury-Tracy, son of Frederick Hanbury-Tracy of the Baron Sudeley.

References

|-

|-

1812 births
1881 deaths
British Army generals
Knights Commander of the Order of the Bath
King's Regiment (Liverpool) officers